Lithops karasmontana, the Karas Mountains living stone, is a species of flowering plant in the ice plant family Aizoaceae, native to Namibia and South Africa (the name refers to the Great Karas Mountains of Namibia).

Description
The almost stemless leaves appear in pairs, and resemble two grey stones with brown mottling on the flat surfaces. White, narrow-rayed flowers  in diameter, appear in autumn.

Lithops karasmontana resists attacks from herbivorous predators by mimicking the local stone formations, in this case quartzite. When not in flower it is extremely difficult to detect.

Cultivation

In temperate regions it must be grown in heat under glass, in conditions similar to those for cactuses. Like all Lithops, it requires extremely well-drained soil.

Like all Lithops it also grows in annual cycles, as the leaf-pairs flower, and then each produces a new leaf-pair that replaces the old one (which shrivels away). The principal rule of watering is that Lithops should be kept dry from when they finish flowering, up until the old leaf-pairs are fully replaced. It has gained the Royal Horticultural Society's Award of Garden Merit.

References

karasmontana
Taxa named by N. E. Brown
Taxa named by Kurt Dinter
Taxa named by Martin Heinrich Gustav Schwantes